Vrtanes also known Saint Vrtanes was the 14th Catholicos-Patriarch of the Armenian Apostolic Church serving from 333 until his death in 341. 

In 333, Vrtanes succeeded Aristaces as third in line in the then-hereditary Parthian line of the Catholicos of the Armenian Catholic Church. Vrtanes was the first son born to St. Gregory I the Illuminator by his wife Miriam and his younger brother was St. Aristaces I. He was the father of St. Husik I and Gregory.

He died on 341 in which he was replaced by his eldest son, St. Husik I, as the next Catholicos-Patriarch.

See also
 Gregorids

340s deaths
Armenian saints
Catholicoi of Armenia
Year of birth unknown